Kapitänleutnant Walther Schwieger (Wilhem Otto Walther Schwieger)  (7 April 1885 – 5 September 1917) was a U-boat commander in the Imperial German Navy (Kaiserliche Marine) during First World War. In 1915, he sank the passenger liner  with the loss of 1,198 lives.

Military career

In 1903 he joined the Imperial German Navy and from 1911 onwards he served with the U-boat Service.

On 31 May 1917, his U-boat  sank the Miyazaki Maru during that ship's voyage from Yokohama to London, causing the loss of eight lives.

Schwieger was killed in action on 5 September 1917. His U-boat  was sunk by the British Q-Ship HMS Stonecrop.

During his wartime career, Schwieger captained three different submarines, on a total of 34 missions. Schwieger was represented in the docudrama "Lusitania: Terror At Sea" in 2007, where he was played by actor Florian Panzner.

References

External links 
Maritimequest U-20 Photo Gallery

1885 births
1917 deaths
Military personnel from Berlin
People from the Province of Brandenburg
U-boat commanders (Imperial German Navy)
RMS Lusitania
Recipients of the Iron Cross (1914), 1st class
Recipients of the Pour le Mérite (military class)
German military personnel killed in World War I
People who died at sea
Imperial German Navy personnel of World War I